Reaching for the Moon ("Rare Flowers") is a 2013 Brazilian biographical drama film, written by Julie Sayres and Matthew Chapman, directed by Bruno Barreto. The film is based on the book Flores Raras e Banalíssimas (in English, Rare and Commonplace Flowers), by Carmem L. Oliveira.

The film dramatizes the love story of the American poet Elizabeth Bishop and the Brazilian architect Lota de Macedo Soares. Set largely in Petrópolis between the years 1951 and 1967, the film tells the story of Bishop's passionate and often tumultuous life with Soares in Brazil.

Cast 
 Glória Pires as Lota de Macedo Soares
Miranda Otto as Elizabeth Bishop
Tracy Middendorf as Mary Morse
Treat Williams as Robert Lowell
Marcello Airoldi as Carlos Lacerda
Lola Kirke as Margaret
Luciana Souza as Joana
Tânia Costa as Dindinha
Marianna Mac Nieven as Malu

Release
Reaching for the Moon had its world premiere at the Berlin Film Festival, before screening at Tribeca Film Festival and opening the 2014 Mardi Gras Film Festival.

Following the sold-out screenings at Mardi Gras Film Festival,  distributor Leap Frog Films announced it was planning a limited release across Australia in 2014.

International distribution
The International distribution rights are being licensed by Cinema Management Group.

References

External links

2013 films
2013 biographical drama films
2013 LGBT-related films
Biographical films about writers
Brazilian biographical drama films
Brazilian LGBT-related films
Films scored by Marcelo Zarvos
Films about architecture
Films based on biographies
Films based on Brazilian novels
Films directed by Bruno Barreto
Films set in the 1950s
Films set in the 1960s
Films set in Brazil
Films set in Rio de Janeiro (city)
Films shot in Rio de Janeiro (city)
Lesbian-related films
2013 drama films
LGBT-related films based on actual events